Benjamin Frommer (born 1969) is an American historian, focused on history of Central Europe in 20th century. His work has concerns topics of genocide and ethnic cleansing, collaboration and resistance, transitional justice, and Central/Eastern European nationalism. Much of his work focuses on The Protectorate of Bohemia and Moravia. He is currently the Charles Deering McCormick Professor and was formerly the Wayne V. Jones Research Professor of History at Northwestern University. He is fluent in Czech, French, German, and Slovak and has reading knowledge of Russian.

Early life and education
He received his Bachelor of Arts from Columbia University in 1991, and his Master of Arts as well as Doctor of Philosophy degree in history in 1999 from Harvard University.

Teaching
Frommer currents teaches Nations and Nationalism (graduate), The Historiography of the Habsburg Monarchy (graduate), and The Historiography of Communist East Europe (graduate) at Northwestern University.

Works
 

The Ghetto Without Walls: The Identification, Isolation, and Elimination of Bohemian and Moravian Jewry, 1938–1945 (forthcoming)

References

External links
  – interview with Benjamin Frommer
  – interview with Benjamin Frommer

1969 births
Living people
Harvard Graduate School of Arts and Sciences alumni
Columbia College (New York) alumni
21st-century American historians
American male non-fiction writers
Northwestern University faculty
Historians of the Czech lands
21st-century American male writers